Marian Bryson was a right handed pitcher in the All-American Girls Professional Baseball League who played for the Peoria Redwings in its 1946 season. Bryson was born in Los Angeles, California. She was dubbed Scotty.

Bryson posted a 0–8 record with a 5.32 ERA in 14 pitching appearances, striking out 11 batters while walking 36 in 71.0 innings of work. As a hitter, she went 2-for-18 for a .112 batting average.

Bryson is part of the AAGPBL permanent display at the Baseball Hall of Fame and Museum at Cooperstown, New York opened in 1988, which is dedicated to the entire league rather than any individual figure.

Sources

All-American Girls Professional Baseball League players
Peoria Redwings players
Baseball players from Los Angeles
Date of birth missing
Place of birth missing
Possibly living people
Year of birth missing
Baseball pitchers